The term Salcombe Yawl refers to a small sailing dinghy restricted class native to Salcombe in South Devon, and also to the traditional sailing vessel from the area upon which that class was based, with a 200-year history. It is built traditionally by hand from mahogany, and is clinker built. The centre plate is cast iron, but more recent Yawls have bronze plates. While it is rigged as a ketch with the mizzen ahead of the rudder post, the label yawl is probably derived from a corruption of the word yole, meaning a small inshore fishing boat. Designers, work within the class restrictions, adding innovations to each vessel. It is raced in two classes depending on the age of the boat. A newly built boat in 2009 would cost £40,000 while a second hand vessel would be half of that. There is a glassfibre derivative with aluminium spars called a Devon Yawl. The mould for this was taken from a 1968 Salcombe Yawl and because of the nature of its construction is a one-design. There are approximately 300 Devon Yawls and they are built both in the UK and USA.

References

External links
 Salcombe Yawl Owners' Association
Complete slide show of the Salcombe yawl Y184 being built

Dinghies
Salcombe